Jorge Muñoz may refer to:

 Jorge Muñoz (Colombian politician)
 Jorge Muñoz (Peruvian politician)
 Jorge Muñoz Cristi, Chilean geologist
 Jorge Muñoz (footballer, born 1981), Chilean footballer
 Jorge Muñoz (footballer, born 1961), Chilean footballer
 Michi Munoz (Jorge Michael Muñoz), Mexican-born American professional boxer